The Carroll County School District is a public school district based in Carrollton, Mississippi (USA). The district's boundaries parallel that of Carroll County.

It is also known as Carroll County Schools (CCS).

History

Billy Joe Ferguson became the superintendent in 1996.

Schools
J. Z. George High School (North Carrollton)
Marshall Elementary School (unincorporated area, adjacent to North Carrollton)

 Former schools
 Vaiden High School (Vaiden) – Consolidated into J. Z. George HS in 1999
 Hathorne Elementary School (Vaiden) In 2006 Hathorne Elementary had 141 students and 21 employees. That year the district leadership proposed closing the school, something criticized by George Tubreville, mayor of Vaiden. The consolidation of Vaiden High and a decline in enrollment at Hathorne contributed to the district deciding to close the elementary school. Hathorne Elementary closed in 2010 and the district stopped using the building. In 2014 Central Mississippi Inc., intending to establish a Head Start program, bought the school for $136,000.

Operations
In 2006 the district had a higher per student spending compared to the Mississippi state average.

Demographics

2006-07 school year
There were a total of 982 students enrolled in the Carroll County School District during the 2006–2007 school year. The gender makeup of the district was 49% female and 51% male. The racial makeup of the district was 70.98% African American, 28.41% White, and 0.61% Hispanic. 76.5% of the district's students were eligible to receive free lunch.

Previous school years

Accountability statistics

See also
List of school districts in Mississippi
 Carroll Academy – Private school in Carrollton, Mississippi

References

External links
 

Education in Carroll County, Mississippi
School districts in Mississippi